East Tilbury is a village and former civil parish in the unitary authority of Thurrock borough, Essex, England, and one of the traditional Church of England parishes in Thurrock. In 1931 the parish had a population of 353.

History
In Saxon times, the location on which the church now stands was surrounded by tidal marshland. This is the probable location for the minster church established by St Cedd at Tilaburg which is mentioned in Bede's History of the English Church.

In the 1860s, Coalhouse Fort was constructed on the bank of the Thames, close to the parish church. This fort was an active part of the defences of London up to and including World War II, having originally been developed as a precaution against French ironclads approaching London up the Thames it was refortified with new armaments as threats changed over the years.

From 1894 to 1936 East Tilbury was part of the Orsett Rural District. The East Tilbury civil parish was abolished on 1 April 1936 when the area became part of Thurrock Urban District.

 The construction of a Bata Shoes factory in the 1930s resulted in substantial development in East Tilbury. The factory has since closed down.

The Bata company developed not only a factory, but also a town for workers, built in the modernist style, and a sizeable estate of listed buildings remains. A sizeable Czech workforce was relocated here, and has merged into the local community after connections were lost with Czechoslovakia after World War II. The father of arts administrator John Tusa, also called John (Jan), was managing director of the factory in the late 30s.

Education
East Tilbury is served by modern infants and junior schools sharing a site opposite the old Bata factory and adjacent to parkland. The junior school recently acquired foundation status.

Politics
East Tilbury ward consists the areas of East Tilbury, East Tilbury Village, Linford and West Tilbury. East Tilbury ward has two Thurrock Councillors, Councillor Sue Sammons elected 2016 (Conservative) and Councillor Fraser Massey elected 2019 (Independent).

Communications and facilities
The town is served by East Tilbury railway station on the Tilbury branch of the c2c service from London Fenchurch Street to Southend Central via Ockendon. East Tilbury is also served by the Nibs Buses route 374 which operates between Grays bus station and Basildon on Mondays to Saturdays.

It is located about 2 miles south of the A13 road from London to Southend.

East Tilbury does not have a developed shopping centre; its nearest major retail centres are located at Basildon and Lakeside.

Developments
The area forms part of the Thames Gateway redevelopment zone and responsibility for delivery in this area is with the Thurrock Development Corporation. Large sections of Metropolitan Green Belt land have been earmarked for development; it is expected to include 14,000 homes and provide 20,000 jobs. East Tilbury is one of seven conservation areas in Thurrock.

On the northern end of the town is a small park called 'Gobions Park'. This got a development grant in 2009 of £50,000. The name may have come from Sir Richard Gobion from UpHavering.

From the late 1950s Esso Petroleum made tentative plans to build an oil refinery on East Tilbury marshes. In 1956 Tilbury Contracting & Dredging sold land that they owned in East Tilbury to Esso Petroleum for about £250,000. The land is marked on an undated map made by the Ministry of Power which also identifies the Occidental Refineries Limited and the United Refineries Limited sites on Canvey Island, which dates the map to about 1971. The land at East Tilbury is marked as 'land suggested for examination as oil refining site'. The 'Esso' land extends southwest from Low Street level crossing (TQ669776) to the river Thames (TQ663754) east of Tilbury power station then along the river past Coalhouse Fort to just north of Coalhouse Battery (TQ691776) then west to Low Street. The project is likely to have been abandoned as a consequence of the 1973 oil crisis and the resulting slump in oil and petroleum consumption.

References

External links

Villages in Essex
Populated places on the River Thames
Former civil parishes in Essex
Thurrock